
This is a list of newspapers in Colombia.

See also
 List of newspapers

References
 prensaescrita.com - diarios de Colombia
 mediatico.com - Diarios de Colombia

Further reading

External links
 
 
 

Colombia
Newspapers published in Colombia
Newspaper